The University of Las Palmas de Gran Canaria, also known as the ULPGC (Spanish Universidad de Las Palmas de Gran Canaria) is a Spanish university located in Las Palmas de Gran Canaria, the capital city of Gran Canaria island. It is the university with the most students in the Canary Islands. It consists of five campuses: four in Gran Canaria (Tafira, Obelisco, San Cristóbal and Montaña Cardones) and one in the island of Lanzarote, with Tafira being the largest. The University was created in 1989 after many years of petitions from the people of Gran Canaria. The university was incorporated through the University Reorganization Act of 1989. ULPGC was created as the aggregation of the teaching centres of former "Universidad Politécnica de Canarias", focused on engineering (industrial, civil, electronics and computer), and the centres from neighbouring Universidad de La Laguna that were located in Las Palmas province.

This University of Las Palmas de Gran Canaria has an important university community of foreign students, being the first university in the Canary Islands and among the first in Spain to receive Erasmus students.

The University of Las Palmas de Gran Canaria, in the academic year 2019/2020, has 1,648 teachers and researchers, 143 research staff in projects, 109 research staff in training, 40 honorary doctors and 837 members and a total of 20,356 students.

Academic programs
The university offers 41 bachelor's degrees, 25 Master's degrees, and 13 PhD programs to over 22,006 students.

The fields offered to cover all the five areas of knowledge, Sciences, Arts and Humanities, Health Sciences, Social and Law Sciences, and Architecture and Engineering.

The university has a Moodle-based virtual campus giving service to all traditional classroom-based teaching and specially to 5 fully on-line grade titles and 4 post-graduate programs. According to a popular Spanish newspaper (El País), the ULPGC uses their online platform in an outstanding way.

According to a popular newspaper ranking, the ULPGC placed 34th out of the 48 public universities in Spain (El Mundo newspaper study). In Spain, public universities overtake private ones. Also, the ULPG is in the position 804th of the world ranking.

Teaching and research staff

The university conducts research in several fields, especially in biomedicine, electronics and computer sciences, and marine sciences. Since 1989, research groups at ULPGC have been awarded approximately 2000 research grants (competitive funding from the Spanish government and from international sources, mainly EU Science programs, a living testament to its academic achievement). As a result, the university has produced more than 3000 articles in peer-reviewed and non-peer-reviewed journals, as well as a number of books and magazine articles.

University Institutes and Excellence in research 
ULPGC Research Institutes
 University Institute of Cybernetic Science and Technology
 University Institute of Applied Microelectronics
 University Institute for Animal Health and Food Security
 Institute of Intelligent Systems and Numerical Applications in Engineering (IUSIANI)
 University Institute for Technological Development and Innovation in Communication (IDeTIC)
 University Institute of Tourism and Sustainable Development (TIDES)
 University Institute of Oceanography and Global Change  (IOCAG)
 University Institute of Text Analysis and Applications (IATEXT)
 University Institute in Biomedical and Health Sciences (IUIBS)
 University Institute of Aquaculture and Sustainable Marine Ecosystems (IU-ECOAQUA)
 University Institute for Environmental Studies and Natural Resources (i-UNAT)

The university institutes are the highest body of research management at the university. ULPGC highlights international research in various fields such as marine science, health, energy, economy and tourism, water and ICT around the sea, as evidenced by the granting of the mention of Campus of Excellence “Tricontinental Atlantic Campus” by the Government of Spain.

The Institute of Tourism and Sustainable Economic Development -Tides-http://tides.es leading the tourism research at the ULPGC has contributed to rank the ULPGC among the top 4 in Europe and top 30 in the world universities in tourism research scientific productivity. ULPGC is the 5th university in Europe and the 1st in Spain in Hospitality research scientific productivity. In tourism research, ULPGC highlights in this ranking in some specific research topics: "Destination Marketing and Management", 2nd in the World (sharing the position with 4 more universities); and "Image and Branding", 4th in the World

Conferences 
ULPGC is the main host and co-host of several international conferences. Mainly:
 International Conference on Computer-Aided Systems Theory
 Nature and Tourism International Conference

In 2005, this university hosted the MoodleMoot Spain conferences. Many universities have followed the example of the ULPGC in online education.

In 2009, the ULPGC has been the co-host for the GUADEC and Akademy 2009 conferences, joining these two leading software conferences in the same place for the first time.

ULPGC store 
A store was opened at the university on November 25, 2014. It is located between the "Las Casitas" cafeteria and the Student Information Service (SIE). The building has two floors and the different items that can be purchased with its own and commercially registered brand are displayed: ULPGC (University of Las Palmas de Gran Canaria).

References

External links 

 

 
1989 establishments in Spain
Universities and colleges in Spain
Las Palmas
Educational institutions established in 1989
Education in the Canary Islands
Organisations based in the Canary Islands
Public universities